The Outfield is an American sports comedy-drama film written by Lydia Genner and directed by Michael Goldfine & Eli Gonda. The film stars Nash Grier, Cameron Dallas, and Joey Bragg.

The film was released through video on demand on November 10, 2015, by Fullscreen Films.

Plot
Three varsity baseball players, who have been best friends since childhood, enter their final year of high school and must make difficult choices on and off the baseball field. They have to decide between what they want and what their parents want.

Cast
 Cameron Dallas as Frankie Payton
 Nash Grier as Jack Sanders
 Joey Bragg as Austin York
 Caroline Sunshine as Emily Jordan
 Sheldon White as Jeremy Porro
 Olivia Stuck as Kelsey Stecken
 Burnie Burns as Theo Rasmussen

Production
In January 2015, it was announced that Fullscreen, a popular YouTube network, would be launching a division to focus on films and that The Outfield, starring Cameron Dallas and Nash Grier, would be one of the first films produced; the film marked Grier's acting debut. On January 28, 2015, it was announced that Joey Bragg and Caroline Sunshine had joined the cast of the film. On February 4, 2015, it was announced that Olivia Stuck had joined the cast of the film. The casting of Burnie Burns was announced on February 15, 2015.

Filming
Principal photography on the film began on January 24, 2015, and concluded on February 21, 2015. Filmed at Ramona Convent Secondary School.

Release
On July 24, 2015, the first 9 minutes of the film were screened at VidCon. The film was released through video on demand on November 10, 2015.

References

2015 films
American sports comedy-drama films
2010s sports comedy-drama films
American baseball films
American independent films
Fullscreen (company)
2015 independent films
2010s English-language films
2010s American films